The 2023 Nigerian presidential election in Gombe State was held on 25 February 2023 as part of the nationwide 2023 Nigerian presidential election to elect the president and vice president of Nigeria. Other federal elections, including elections to the House of Representatives and the Senate, will also be held on the same date while state elections will be held two weeks afterward on 11 March.

Background
Gombe State is a small, diverse northeastern state with a growing economy and vast natural areas but facing an underdeveloped yet vital agricultural sector, desertification, and some inter-ethnic violence. Politically, the state's 2019 elections were categorized by a large swing towards the state APC. In federal elections, Buhari held the state for the APC while the APC swept all senate seats by gaining two PDP-held seats. Similarly, the APC gained two PDP-held House seats to sweep all House of Representatives elections. On the state level, the APC gained the governorship and the majority in the House of Assembly. The 2019 elections also bridged the political divide between the diverse, Christian-majority Southern region and the mainly Hausa and Fulani, Muslim-majority Northern and Central regions as the former region moved towards the APC in tandem with the latter two regions.

Polling

Projections

General election

Results

By senatorial district 
The results of the election by senatorial district.

By federal constituency
The results of the election by federal constituency.

By local government area 
The results of the election by local government area.

See also 
 2023 Gombe State elections
 2023 Nigerian presidential election

Notes

References 

Gombe State gubernatorial election
2023 Gombe State elections
Gombe